Salahaldin International School is an international school in New Cairo, Cairo Governorate, Egypt since 2009.
The school, which opened in May 2009, is the first international school in Egypt. The school uses the United States educational system and serves grades Kindergarten through 12. English is the school's primary language. It has one school in Cairo, Alexandria, and Beni Suef. It uses technology for education. They use an iPad starting from grade 3. 

The Arabic language is also taught based on the Egyptian Ministry of Education curriculum. French and German languages are taught throughout the school year.

School transportation is available at an extra cost for the parents.

Nearly 1260 students from 69 countries attend school.

References

External links

 sis.edu.eg

International schools in Greater Cairo
2009 establishments in Egypt
Educational institutions established in 2009
Schools in New Cairo